Olympus or Olympos (Ólympos) was a city in ancient Lycia. It was situated in a river valley near the coast. Its ruins are located south of the modern town Çıralı in the Kumluca district of Antalya Province, southwestern Turkey. Together with the sites of the ancient cities Phaselis and Idyros it is part of the Olympos Beydaglari National Park. The perpetual gas fires at Yanartaş are found a few kilometers to the northwest of the site.

History 

The exact date of the city's foundation is unknown. A wall and an inscription on a sarcophagus have been dated to the end of the 4th century BC, so Olympus must have been founded at the latest in the Hellenistic period. The city presumably taking its name from nearby Mount Olympus (Timber Mountain), one of over twenty mountains with the name Olympus in the Classical world.

The city was a member of the Lycian League, but it is uncertain when it joined the League. It started minting Lycian League coins from the end of the second century BC, possibly the 130s. At this time Olympus was one of the six largest cities of the League, which possessed three votes each.

Around 100 BC, Olympus started issuing its own coins, separate from the League. At this point Cilician pirates under Zekenites had taken control of Olympus's Mediterranean possessions, which included Corycus, Phaselis and many other places in Pamphylia. His rule ended in 78 BC, when the Roman commander Publius Servilius Isauricus, accompanied by the young Julius Caesar, captured Olympus and its other territories after a victory at sea. At his defeat, Zekenites set fire to his own house in Olympus and perished. At the time of the Roman conquest, Olympus was described by Cicero as a rich and highly decorated city. Olympus then became part of the Roman Republic. The emperor Hadrian visited the city, after which it took the name of Hadrianopolis (Ἁδριανούπολις) for a period, in his honour.

Olympus is missing from the Stadiasmus Patarensis and the Stadiasmus Maris Magni. However, both include the already mentioned Corycus, which is described in ancient sources as a port of some significance. There is no evidence that Olympus was a maritime city prior to the 2nd century AD. On this basis Mustafa Adak has argued that Olympus was initially founded on Mount Olympus, which he identifies as Musa Dağı instead of Tahtalı Dağı. In his theory, the Romans destroyed Olympus, after which the population moved to Corycus, and the name of Corycus was changed to Olympus when Hadrian visited the city in 131 AD.

In the Middle Ages, Venetians, Genoese and Rhodians built two fortresses along the coast, but by the 15th century Olympus had been abandoned. Today the site attracts tourists, not only for the artifacts that can still be found (though fragmentary and widely scattered), but also for its scenic landscapes supporting wild grapevines, flowering oleander, bay trees, figs and pines.

Bishopric 

Olympus became a Christian bishopric, a suffragan of the metropolitan see of Myra, the capital of the Roman province of Lycia. Its earliest recorded bishop was Saint Methodius of Olympus, whose service at the head of church in Olympus extended from the late 3rd century to his martyrdom in about 311. Aristocritus was at the Council of Ephesus in 431 and the Council of Chalcedon in 451. Anatolius was a signatory of the joint letter that the bishops of Lycia sent in 458 to Byzantine Emperor Leo I the Thracian regarding the murder of Proterius of Alexandria. Ioannes took part in the synod convoked in 536 by Patriarch Menas of Constantinople.
Pseudo-Epiphanius writes that the Metropolis of Myra had 36 cities and/or bishops under it, including Olympus.

No longer a residential bishopric, Olympus is today listed by the Catholic Church as a titular see.

Layout

Modern times 

Olympus is now a popular tourist area.  The ruins of the ancient city end in a valley that holds numerous pensions and guest houses.  The valley is bound on the water side by Mount Omurga.

See also
List of Lycian place names
Lycian Way

References

Sources

Further reading

External links 

Official website 
Entry in The Princeton Encyclopedia of Classical Sites
Map of the antique Olympus
Photos from the ruins

Archaeological sites in Antalya Province
Ancient Greek archaeological sites in Turkey
Populated places in ancient Lycia
Turkish Riviera
Former populated places in Turkey
Hellenistic colonies in Anatolia
Geography of Antalya Province
Catholic titular sees in Asia
Kumluca District